As One – Chapter Four is the fourth studio album by the German power metal band Metalium, released in 2004.

Track listing
"Astral Avatar" - 1:30
"Warrior" - 3:56
"Pain Crawls in the Night" - 4:27
"Find Out" - 6:29
"No One Will Save You" - 4:46
"Meaning of Light" - 1:22
"Illuminated" - 9:45
"Meaning of Light (Reprise)" - 1:04
"Athena" - 4:46
"Power Strikes the Earth" - 5:44
"Goddess of Love and Pain" - 5:19
"As One" - 4:45
"Screaming in the Darkness" - 5:44 (European bonus track)
"Don't Tell No Lies" - 5:36 (Japanese bonus track)

Personnel
Band members
Henning Basse - vocals  
Matthias Lange - guitars  
Lars Ratz - bass 
Michael Ehré - drums

Guest 
Saeko Kitamae - vocals as Metaliana

External links
Metalium Official Website

Metalium albums
2004 albums